The Lake Oswego Review is an American newspaper published in Lake Oswego, Oregon, within the Portland metropolitan area. It is owned by the Pamplin Media Group.

History 
The paper began as the Western Clackamas Review, was later known as the Oswego Review from 1929 through 1961, and then adopted its present name when the city of Oswego annexed Lake Grove and the lake. It has been published weekly since 1988.

Owners prior to Pamplin include Eagle Newspapers and Steve and Randalyn Clark. Prior publishers include Bill Blizzard and Joe Blaha.

References

External links 
 
 Lake Oswego Review overview at Oregon Newspaper Publishers Association website

1961 establishments in Oregon
Review
Newspapers published by Pamplin Media Group
Oregon Newspaper Publishers Association
Publications established in 1961

Newspapers published in Oregon